Anna Karin Margareta Falck (born 6 February 1932) is a Swedish television director, hostess and producer.

Career
Karin Falck was born in Säffle, Värmland County and lived her first six years of life in Karlstad. She moved with her mother and younger brother to Stockholm when she was 6 years old since her father died. In her youth, she dreamed of playing ice hockey.

When Karin Falck started on TV, she had studied theater history and English at Stockholm University, where she wrote an essay on children's theater. She then became an assistant to Elsa Olenius who started Barnteatern (now Vår Teater).

She began her TV career in 1954 as a scriptwriter in Alf Sjöberg's TV set of Hamlet. Curiosity about the television medium made her apply for Radiotjänst's first producer course in 1955. The supervisors came from the BBC in London. Other female TV pioneers on the course were Ingrid Samuelsson, Marianne Anderberg, Lena Fürst and Barbro Svinhufvud.

Karin Falck's work spans a large part of the history of Swedish television. She was employed at SVT, then known as Sveriges Radio, already in 1956 and has produced and directed many entertainment programs over the years, as well as light drama, theatre and cabaret shows. In 1975, she hosted the Eurovision Song Contest in Stockholm. In 2007, she received the Lifetime Achievement Award at the annual Kristallen, the Swedish television awards. In 2020, she was made a member of the Melodifestivalen Hall of Fame.

See also
List of Eurovision Song Contest presenters
List of Melodifestivalen presenters

References

External links

1932 births
Living people
Swedish television personalities
Swedish women television presenters
Swedish television producers
Women television producers
Swedish television directors
Women television directors